Chamallamudi is a village in Vatticherukuru mandal, in Guntur district of Andhra Pradesh, India.

Temples 
1. GangaParvathi Sametha Chandrasekhara Swami Temple 
2. Seetha Ramanjaneswami Temple 
3. Addemkamma Temple

References 

Villages in Guntur district